The Supreme Court, earlier known as the Supreme Court of Cassation, is the court of last resort in the Republic of Serbia. It is the court of cassation which reviews and possibly overturns previous rulings made by lower courts. It was established in 1846 by a decree of Prince Aleksandar Karađorđević. In the last 160 years since it was established, the Court has asserted its authority within judiciary in Serbia and beyond. The Supreme Court is today authorized by the Constitution of Serbia and the Law on Organization of Courts.

The seat of the Supreme Court is in Belgrade. The court is currently composed of the President of the Court and 49 judges (since 2020), although the number of judges is periodically reviewed. The current President of the Supreme Court is Jasmina Vasović.

History

Principality and Kingdom of Serbia
The Supreme Land Court (Врховни суд земаљски) of the Principality of Serbia was formed in 1846 as the court of last resort by the decree of Prince Aleksandar Karađorđević. It was composed of the President and four judges. The president and the judges were appointed by the Prince on the recommendation of the Minister of Justice. This Court was a trial court, while the appeals were heard by the Prince himself.

The Supreme Court became the court of cassation (appellate court) in 1855 when it was renamed to The Most Glorious Supreme and Cassation Court (Високославниј Врховниј и Касациониј Суд). The Court had a President and eight judges with two chambers. After the reorganization in 1858, the Court was reformed to The Most Glorious Court of Cassation and it lost the original jurisdiction, becoming solely the appellate court. The composition of the Court remained the same as before the reorganization. It heard the cases in civil law, criminal law, and cases involving the conflict of jurisdiction between the military, police and civil courts.

The modernization and strengthening of the judicial system in Serbia continued during the Defenders of the Constitution era (1842–1858). The results of this modernization were the separation of judicial and executive branch, creation of the positive law, weakening of Prince's autocracy and implementation of the financial control. After this, Prince Miloš Obrenović ruled for the second time (1858–1860). This period was marked by further development of the positive law and judicial independence. After Miloš, his son Mihailo came to power. He used the Serbo-Turkish War of 1862 to limit the executive and legislative power, but not the judiciary. The judicial procedure was formalised in this period.

Finally, in 1865, the Law on the Organization of the Courts was passed, and the courts were organized into the district courts, the courts of appeal and the Court of Cassation. According to the Law, the Court of Cassation had three chambers. The Court was composed of 15 judges, one of them being the president. The judges were appointed by the Prince through a decree. The Law gave the Court of Cassation the power of judicial interpretation instead of the Minister of Justice. The Court was still under the Government's influence, but the judicial independence was constantly strengthening.

The Constitution of 1869, the Constitution of 1888 and the Law on Judges of 1881 confirmed the judicial independence and the three-level court system. An amendment to the Law on the Court of Cassation of 1895 gave the Court of Cassation the power to interprets the law to the lower courts and to give legal opinions in certain cases.

In 1901, a new Law on Judges was passed. This Law was very important for the development of the court system. The Court of Cassation became authorized to try a judge who was found to violate the law.

Kingdom of Yugoslavia

The first Constitution (Vidovdan Constitution) of the Kingdom of Yugoslavia was adopted in 1921. It enacted the unification of the judicial systems of the countries that formed the Kingdom. It authorized the creation of the singular Court of Cassation of the Kingdom with its seat in Zagreb and with the jurisdiction over the whole nation. This Court was never actually created. The five Cassation Courts continued to work in the Kingdom: the Court of Cassation in Belgrade, the Supreme Court in Sarajevo, the Chamber of Seven in Zagreb, the great Court in Podgorica, and the Department of Belgrade's Court of Cassation in Novi Sad. Each of these courts had jurisdiction over a specific part of the Kingdom.
 
The Court of Cassation in Belgrade continued to work with its jurisdiction over all the lower-level courts on the territory of the former Kingdom of Serbia, as well as on the territory of Banat, Bačka and Baranja and over the higher, appeal courts in Belgrade, Novi Sad and Skopje. After the reorganization of 1922, the Belgrade's Court of Cassation (and its department in Novi Sad) had 35 judges. The Department of the Court of Cassation in Novi Sad had jurisdiction over the territory of Banat, Bačka and Baranja. It had 5 judges. Judges were appointed by the King after the recommendation of the Minister of Justice. Although the courts were independent, this principle was often violated.

New Law on the Organization of the Courts was passed in 1928, and although it again authorized the creation of a single Court of Cassation in Zagreb, it was never formed. The decentralized judicial system proved quite problematic in practice. This led to many cases of conflicts of jurisdiction between the five courts.

During the so-called 6 January Dictatorship period, the effort were made to unify the courts of the Kingdom. The Supreme Judicial Council was formed in 1929, and it succeeded in the unification of the material law, criminal law, civil law and procedural law in the Kingdom. A single Criminal Code for all of the Kingdom was passed in 1929. The National Court for the Protection of the State was formed in 1929 as a department of Belgrade's Court of Cassation to protect the public regime and public security. A state prosecutor was appointed for this court. It was mostly deciding in the cases involving insulting of the king and the royal family. This became the highest court in the country, as there was no way to appeal its decision. It worked in chambers of seven judges each. They were appointed by the King on the recommendation of the Minister of Justice. This court later became independent.

World War II
During World War II, the People's Liberation Committees were enforced by the Communist Party as the bodies of "people's authority". The Committee for Justice of the National Committee for the Liberation of Yugoslavia demanded the separation of judicial from executive power and judicial independence in the new communist Yugoslavia. In 1945, the Law on the Organization of the People's Courts was passed.

According to the federalism principle, the Supreme Courts of the six People's Republics became the highest courts in the Republics, and were entitled to decide on all appeals. According to the new communist principles of people's democracy, non-educated judges were allowed to be members of the courts along with law-educated judges.

Later in 1945, the Supreme Court of Yugoslavia was created with its seat in Belgrade. Judicial power on the territory of the People's Republic of Serbia was given to the "people's courts": municipal courts, district courts and the Supreme People's Court with its seat in Belgrade. It functioned as both trial court and court of appeals. The Supreme Court of Serbia had a president, 14 judges and particular number of "people's co-judges" from common population. It had criminal and civil chambers and a disciplinary chamber. The Law proclaimed the courts to be free and independent from other branches of the government.

Socialist Republic of Serbia
The organization of the courts was not changed until 1955. In 1954, new Law on Courts was passed, accompanied with the Law on Trade Courts and Law on Military Courts. The Supreme Courts of the Republics became solely courts of appeals without original jurisdiction. The 1963 Constitution of Serbia did not bring any major changes to the judicial organization. This constitution authorized creation of the Constitutional Court of Serbia for the judicial review. With the 1971 amendments on the federal constitution, the judicial system was further decentralized, and the organization of the courts became the jurisdiction of the Republics and Autonomous Provinces.

Jurisdiction

Jurisdiction inside court proceedings
The Supreme Court decides on regular and extraordinary legal remedies instituted against decisions of all courts in the Republic of Serbia and on other issues prescribed by the law. The Supreme Court decides on a conflict of jurisdiction between the courts and the transfer of jurisdiction of courts to facilitate conducting of procedure or other significant reasons.

Jurisdiction outside of court proceedings
 determines general legal positions in order to provide uniform application of law by courts;
 provides opinions on draft laws and other regulations relevant for performance of judicial authority;
 analyzes application of laws and other regulations and work of the courts;
 selects the invited members of the High Judicial Council among judges and proposes candidates for one permanent member of the High Judicial Council;
 determines criteria for evaluation of diligent and successful performance of judge's function;
 determines the activities that are contrary to the dignity and independence of a judge and damaging to the reputation of the court;
 determines the types and manner of advanced training of judges and performs other tasks prescribed by law;

Composition
Current composition of the Court is as follows:

 Jasmina Vasović (President of the Court)
 Dragan Aćimović (2014)
 Jelica Bojanić Kerkez (2018)
 Dragana Boljević (2021)
 Branislav Bosiljković (2017)
 Nevenka Važić (2010)
 Dubravka Damjanović (2021)
 Zorana Delibašić (2018)
 Radmila Dragičević-Dičić (2010)
 Branka Dražić (2020)
 Spomenka Zarić (2014)
 Ilija Zindović (2019)
 Jovan Jovanović, President of the Commercial Court in Belgrade
 Dragan Jocić, President of the Appellate Court in Niš
 Gordana Komnenić (2020)
 Zvezdana Lutovac (2010)
 Katarina Manojlović Andrić (2017)
 Dragana Marinković (2020)
 Marina Milanović (2019)
 Duško Milenković, President of the Appellate Court in Belgrade
 Tatjana Miljuš (2020)
 Dragana Mirosavljević (2021)
 Slađana Nakić Momirović (2014)
 Danijela Nikolić (2020)
 Radoslav Petrović (2015)
 Ivana Rađenović (2021)
 Milena Rašić (2021)
 Biljana Sinanović (2010)
 Dragiša Slijepčević (2017)
 Jasminka Stanojević (2014)
 Branko Stanić (2014)
 Jasmina Stamenković (2020)
 Aleksandar Stepanović, President of the High Court in Belgrade
 Dobrila Strajina (2017)
 Vesna Subić (2017)
 Miroljub Tomić (2017)
 Svetlana Tomić Jokić (2021)
 Zoran Hadžić (2021)
 Bata Cvetković (2010)
Gordana Džakula (2019)

Year of election to the Supreme Court is given in parenthesis. Although the membership is currently set at 50 (President and 49 judges), there are some vacant seats.

Presidents (since 1990)
Source:

 Status

See also
Constitutional Court of Serbia

Notes

References
This article incorporates text from the Constitutional Court of Serbia official site, which is in the public domain, because it is a law, decree, regulation or official material of a Republic of Serbia state body or a body performing public functions, under the terms of Article 6, Paragraph 2 of Serbian copyright law.  See Copyright.

External links
Supreme Court of Serbia official website

Law of Serbia
Serbia
Courts and tribunals established in 1846